Anette Fanqvist (born June 16, 1969) is a Swedish cross-country skier who competed from 1992 to 2002. She won a bronze medal in the 4 × 5 km relay at the 1995 FIS Nordic World Ski Championships in Thunder Bay, and had her best individual finish of 27th in the 15 km event at those same championships.

Fanqvist's best individual finish at the Winter Olympics was 37th in the 30 km event at Nagano in 1998. Her best individual career finish was second twice up to 10 km in Sweden (1995, 1998).

Cross-country skiing results
All results are sourced from the International Ski Federation (FIS).

Olympic Games

World Championships
 1 medal – (1 bronze)

World Cup

Season standings

Team podiums

 2 podiums

Note:   Until the 1999 World Championships, World Championship races were included in the World Cup scoring system.

References

External links

1969 births
Living people
Swedish female cross-country skiers
Cross-country skiers at the 1998 Winter Olympics
FIS Nordic World Ski Championships medalists in cross-country skiing
Olympic cross-country skiers of Sweden
People from Ånge Municipality